The LPM Youth and Students Command Element is a youth and student wing body of the Landless People's Movement (Namibia). Formed in 2018, the wing has been led by Duminga Ndala since its inception.

Representation
The LPM youth and student command element was formed to fight for the social and economic rights of youths and students in Namibia. In December 2020, the organisation raised strong complaints against singer Adora after she raised what the organization said were tribal remarks.

External links
LPM Student Command Element Twitter

References

Student politics
Youth wings of political parties in Namibia
Youth wings of social democratic parties